For lists of Canada men's national soccer team results see:

 Canada men's national soccer team results (1924–1977)
 Canada men's national soccer team results (1980–1999)
 Canada men's national soccer team results (2000–2019)
 Canada men's national soccer team results (2020–present)
 Canada men's national soccer team results (unofficial matches)